Sabir Ali (born 18 July 1970) is a politician from Bihar state, India. He was member of Rajya Sabha from Bihar during 2008-2014. He was a member of the Janata Dal (United) but was expelled from the party in March 2014 for praising Narendra Modi and his "plans and policies". Subsequently, he joined BJP. He said that "had seen so called secular parties from close quarters due to his association with them and there is a difference between what they preach and what they practice", accusing them of trying to cheat Muslims in the name of secularism.

He hails from Raxaul in the East Champaran district of Bihar.

References

21st-century Indian Muslims
1970 births
Living people
Lok Janshakti Party politicians
Janata Dal (United) politicians
Bharatiya Janata Party politicians from Bihar